Agrostophyllum elongatum, the elongated Agrostophyllum, is a member of Orchidaceae, found in the Philippines, Borneo, Java, Malaysia, Maluku, Sumatra, New Guinea, the Solomons, Vanuatu and the Caroline Islands.

References

elongatum
Orchids of the Philippines
Orchids of Borneo
Orchids of Java
Orchids of Malaysia
Orchids of Indonesia
Orchids of Sumatra
Orchids of New Guinea
Flora of the Solomon Islands (archipelago)
Flora of Vanuatu
Flora of the Caroline Islands